Kevin Avila Soto (born 22 December 1992 in Santa Catarina Pinula) is a Guatemalan swimmer. At the 2012 Summer Olympics, he competed in the Men's 100 metre freestyle, finishing in 37th place overall in the heats, failing to qualify for the semifinals. Soto also competed in the 100 m event at the 2013 World Aquatics Championships. He swims for the Guatemalan club named "Club Delfines de Natación" and his coach is Morgan Armando Sanchez.

References

People from Guatemala Department
Guatemalan male freestyle swimmers
Living people
Olympic swimmers of Guatemala
Swimmers at the 2012 Summer Olympics
1992 births
Swimmers at the 2010 Summer Youth Olympics
Swimmers at the 2011 Pan American Games
Pan American Games competitors for Guatemala